Bae Jung-son (? ~ 1271) is one of the generals who led Sambyeolcho for a few months after Wonjong moved to Gaegyeong.

Life 
He was opposed to Mongolians (Yuan dynasty) in China because he hated them. At 23 May 1270 when the King of Goryeo 'Wonjong' decided to return to Gaegyeong(now Gaeseong) from Ganghwa Island, he opposed and refused it. So king 'Wonjong' ordered disbandment to Sambyeolcho, but he refused it, too. Then he moved Sambyeolcho from Ganghwa Island to Jindo Island at 3 June 1270, and continued being opposed to Mongolian. But he died April, 1271 when Goryeo – Mongolian allies invaded and occupied Jindo Island.

After he died 
Some survivors such as Kim Tong-jeong escaped Ganghwa Island and moved to Jeju Island, but they vanished at 1273 by Goryeo-Mongolian allies. That was the end of Sambyeolcho.

References 

육군본부, "한국의 명장:전사연구제5집", p. 128-139

Korean generals
1271 deaths
Year of birth unknown